Phiaris is a genus of moths belonging to the family Tortricidae.

Species
Phiaris acropryerana Bae, 2000
Phiaris bipunctana (Fabricius, 1794)
Phiaris castaneanum (Walsingham, 1900)
Phiaris dolosana (Kennel, 1901)
Phiaris electana (Kennel, 1901)
Phiaris examinatus (Falkovitsh, 1966)
Phiaris exilis (Falkovitsh, 1966)
Phiaris hokkaidana Bae, 2000
Phiaris komaii Bae, 2005
Phiaris metallicana (Hübner, [1799])
Phiaris micana ([Denis & Schiffermüller], 1775)
Phiaris mori (Matsumura, 1900)
Phiaris morivora (Matsumura, 1900)
Phiaris opacalis Bae, 2000
Phiaris palustrana (Lienig & Zeller, 1846) 
Phiaris pryeranum (Walsingham, 1900)
Phiaris schulziana (Fabricius, 1777)
Phiaris semicremana (Christoph, 1881)
Phiaris siderana (Treitschke, 1835)
Phiaris stibiana (Guenée, 1845)
Phiaris subelectana (Kawabe, 1976)
Phiaris toshiookui Bae, 2000
Phiaris transversana (Christoph, 1881)
Phiaris tsutavora (Oku, 1971)

See also
List of Tortricidae genera

References

External links
tortricidae.com
Biolib

Olethreutini
Tortricidae genera
Taxa named by Jacob Hübner